Ethics is an unfinished book by Dietrich Bonhoeffer that was edited and published after his death by Eberhard Bethge in 1949. Bonhoeffer worked on the book in the early 1940s and intended it to be his magnum opus. The central theme of Ethics is Christlikeness. The arguments in the book are informed by Lutheran Christology and are influenced by Bonhoeffer's participation in the German resistance to Nazism. Ethics is commonly compared to Bonhoeffer's earlier book The Cost of Discipleship, with scholars debating the extent to which Bonhoeffer's views on Christian ethics changed between his writing of the two books. In The Cambridge Companion to Dietrich Bonhoeffer, John W. de Gruchy argues that Ethics evinces more nuance than Bonhoeffer's earlier writings. In 2012, David P. Gushee, director of Mercer University's Center for Theology and Public Life, named Ethics one of the five best books about patriotism.

Bibliography

References

Unfinished books
1949 non-fiction books
Works by Dietrich Bonhoeffer
Ethics books
Christian theology books
Books about spirituality
Christian devotional literature
Christian pacifism
Nazi Germany and Protestantism
Christian theology and politics
History of Lutheranism in Germany
Pacifism in Germany
Books about politics of Germany
Anti-fascist books
German non-fiction books
Books published posthumously
Patriotism
Lutheran texts
20th-century Lutheranism
1940s in Christianity